Zingis is a genus of air-breathing land snails, terrestrial pulmonate gastropod mollusks in the family Helicarionidae.

Species
Species in the genus Zingis include:
 Zingis nyassana (E. A. Smith, 1881)
 Zingis radiolata von Martens

References 

 
Helicarionidae
Taxa named by Eduard von Martens
Gastropod genera
Taxonomy articles created by Polbot